Anna Movsisyan (born 15 July 1988) is a retired Armenian tennis player.

Movsisyan was born in Yerevan. On 20 April 2009, she reached her best singles ranking of world No. 773. On 15 September 2008, she peaked at No. 603 in the WTA doubles rankings.

Playing for Armenia Fed Cup team until 2018, Movsisyan has a win–loss record of 29–17.

ITF finals

Doubles (0–3)

References

External links
 
 
 

1988 births
Living people
Sportspeople from Yerevan
Armenian female tennis players